The United Freedom Front (UFF) was a small American Marxist organization active in the 1970s and 1980s. It was originally called the Sam Melville/Jonathan Jackson Unit, and its members became known as the Ohio 7 when they were brought to trial. Between 1975 and 1984 the UFF carried out at least 20 bombings and nine bank robberies in the northeastern United States, targeting corporate buildings, courthouses, and military facilities. Brent L. Smith describes them as "undoubtedly the most successful of the leftist terrorists of the 1970s and 1980s." The group's members were eventually apprehended and convicted of conspiracy, murder, attempted murder, and other charges.

Activities
The group was founded in 1975 as the Sam Melville/Jonathan Jackson Unit, setting off a bomb at the Massachusetts State House under that name, but changed its name to the United Freedom Front the same year. The initial members were Raymond Luc Levasseur (the UFF's leader), Tom Manning, and their respective spouses, Patricia Gros and Carole Manning. Levasseur and Tom Manning were both Vietnam War veterans and ex-convicts. The four had worked together in prison reform groups before forming the UFF. Four other members joined the group in the following years: Jaan Laaman and Barbara Curzi (another married couple), Kazi Toure (born Christopher King), and Richard Williams.

The UFF claimed to oppose US foreign policy in Central America, as well as South African apartheid. In March of 1984 the group detonated a bomb after a warning call at an IBM building in Harrison, New York reportedly for selling computer parts to the South African regime.

The UFF's targets included South African Airways, Union Carbide, IBM, Mobil, courthouses, and military facilities. The UFF called in warnings before all of its bombings, attempting to avoid casualties.  However, 22 people were injured in one 1976 bombing at the Suffolk County Courthouse in Boston, including a courthouse worker who lost a leg.  The group was most active in the early 1980s.  The UFF's members lived undercover in middle-class suburbs. 

On December 21, 1981, New Jersey state police officer Philip J. Lamonaco was shot dead during a routine traffic stop of Thomas Manning and Richard Williams. Both Manning and Williams were charged with the murder of Lamonaco, allegedly shooting him eight times with a 9mm automatic pistol. Manning claimed he was alone in the car at the time of the shooting with the prosecution claiming Williams was present at the scene and shooter of Lamonaco. Manning got life for the shooting whilst Williams was acquitted.

The investigation of the group intensified after the killing of the police officer leading to a federal task force to be formed in 1983. Toure was captured in North Attleboro, Massachusetts in 1982.  Two state troopers were wounded in the course of arresting him.  On November 4, 1984, police apprehended Levasseur and Gros near Deerfield, Ohio, and Laaman, Curzi, and Williams in Cleveland.  The Mannings were captured six months later in Norfolk, Virginia. Dr. Gus Martin notes that the UFF was "the most enduring of all New Left terrorist groups of the era," evading capture for almost a decade.

Trials and imprisonment
The UFF's members were tried repeatedly on various federal and state charges.  In March 1986, seven of them (the so-called "Ohio Seven") were convicted of conspiracy, receiving sentences ranging from 15 to 53 years. In 1987, all eight members were charged with sedition and racketeering.  

Eventually five accepted plea bargains, had charges against them dropped, or were tried separately, and the trial of the remaining three ended in 1989 with an acquittal for sedition for all three and acquittal for Patricia Levasseur (formerly Gros and now Rowbottom) for RICO Conspiracy and a deadlocked (hung) jury on the substantive racketeering charges. Thomas Manning and Richard Williams were given life sentences for the 1981 murder of state trooper Philip Lamonaco, and Laaman was convicted in the 1982 attempted murder of two state troopers.  The activist defense lawyer William Kunstler represented UFF members in some of these proceedings.

Toure, Curzi, Gros, and Carol Manning were released during the 1990s, and Levasseur was released in November 2004. Williams died in prison in December 2005, Tom Manning died in prison in July 2019  and Laaman was released in May 2021.

Legal cases
USA v. Patricia Gros: 84-CR-0222 	
USA v. Raymond Luc Levasseur et al.: 86-CR-180

In popular media
In an episode of The FBI Files, "Radical Agenda" the FBI investigation of the United Freedom Front was featured and dramatized.

In a made-for-television movie, In The Line Of Duty: Hunt For Justice, 1995, the murder of Trooper Philip Lamonaco was featured, as was the investigation into, and arrests of the members of the terrorist organization the United Freedom Front.

References

Further reference

"Group Hit Other Targets, FBI Believes," Ronald Kessler, 11/09/1983, Washington Post 	
"Case-Study of US Domestic Terrorism: United Freedom Front," Phillip Jenkins 	
"After 13 Bombings, FBI Says Terrorists Remain a Mystery," Rick Hampson, 09/27/1984, AP

External links
 Case Study: The United Freedom Front

American bank robbers
Crimes in Massachusetts
Defunct communist organizations in the United States
Far-left politics in the United States
Left-wing militant groups in the United States
New Left
Organizations designated as terrorist by the United States
Political violence in the United States
Terrorism in the United States